Jangy-Jer is a village in Chüy Region of Kyrgyzstan. It is part of the Sokuluk District. Its population was 6,128 in 2021.

Population

References

Populated places in Chüy Region